A punch is a striking blow with the fist. It is used in most martial arts and combat sports, most notably boxing, where it is the only type of offensive technique allowed. In sports, hand wraps or other padding such as gloves may be used to protect athletes and practitioners from injuring themselves.

The use of punches varies between different martial arts and combat sports. Styles such as boxing, Suntukan or Russian fist fighting use punches alone, while others such as Kickboxing, Muay Thai, Lethwei or karate may use both punches and kicks. Others such as wrestling (excluding professional wrestling) and judo (punches and other striking techniques, atemi, are present in judo kata, but are forbidden in competitions) do not use punches at all. There are many types of punches and as a result, different styles encompass varying types of punching techniques.

Basic types 

This is not a comprehensive list of all punches and may need to be updated, due to the large diversity of schools of practice whose techniques, employing arm, shoulder, hip and leg work, may invariably differ.

Styles

Boxing 

In boxing, punches are classified according to the motion and direction of the strike; contact is always made with the knuckles. There are four primary punches in boxing: the jab, cross, hook, and uppercut.

Karate 
Punching techniques in karate are called tsuki or zuki. Contact is made with the first two knuckles (seiken). If any other part of the hand is used to strike with, such as the back of the fist (uraken) or the bottom of the fist (tetsui), then the blow is classified as a strike (uchi).

Karate punches include the thrust punch oi-zuki made using the lead-hand, straight punch choku-zuki, reverse punch gyaku-zuki, made from the opposite (lead) hand, and many other variations.

Gallery

References

External links  
 
 
 How to punch harder in a street fight

 
Pain infliction methods
Martial art techniques
Kickboxing terminology
Articles containing video clips